Enteromius bourdariei is a species of ray-finned fish in the genus Enteromius which ha so far only been recorded in the Noun River and Lake Monoun in Cameroon.

The fish is named in honor of Paul Bourdarie (1864-1950), the co-founder and permanent secretary of l’Académie des Sciences Coloniales, now known as Académie des sciences d'outre-mer, a society dedicated to the history and geography of Africa, Latin America, Asia and Oceania.

Footnotes

References

Endemic fauna of Cameroon
Enteromius
Taxa named by Jacques Pellegrin
Fish described in 1928